{{Infobox film
| name           = Thundering Jets
| image          = Thundering Jets poster.jpg
| alt            = 
| caption        = Theatrical release poster
| director       = Helmut Dantine
| producer       = Jack Leewood 
| screenplay     = James Landis
| starring       = Rex ReasonDick ForanAudrey DaltonBarry CoeBuck ClassRobert Dix
| music          = Irving Gertz
| cinematography = John M. Nickolaus, Jr.
| editing        = Frank Baldridge
| studio         = Regal Films Inc
| distributor    = 20th Century Fox
| released       = <ref>"Of local origin. The New York Times, May 28, 1958.</ref>
| runtime        = 73 minutes
| country        = United States
| language       = English
| budget         = 
| gross          = 
}}Thundering Jets is a 1958 American drama film directed by Helmut Dantine, written by James Landis, and starring Rex Reason, Dick Foran, Audrey Dalton, Barry Coe, and Robert Dix.Thundering Jets was released in May 1958, by 20th Century Fox."Trailer - Cast - Showtimes: Thundering-Jets." The New York Times. Retrieved: September 21, 2015.

Plot
At the United States Edwards Air Force Base Flight Test School, instructor wartime veteran, Capt. Steve Morley (Rex Reason) resents "playing nursemaid to a bunch of glory jockeys." The new class includes Kurt Weber (Giuseppe Addobbati), who flew for Germany during World War II; Maj. Mike Geron (Buck Class); show-off Capt. Murphy (Lee Farr); Lt. Jimmy Erskine (Robert Dix) and  Lt. Bob Kiley (Robert Conrad).

Steve meets his sweetheart, Susan Blair (Audrey Dalton), a secretary for Lt. Col. Spalding (Dick Fora). Dissatisfied with his role, his pupils continue to have problems as he tries to stress that discipline is important. Both Susan and Steve's fellow flight instructors caution him that he is too harsh. Asking again for a transfer, Steve is denied.

On a training mission the next day, Murphy flies dangerously and is expelled for his irresponsible behaviour. Fellow students, are certain that Steve is to blame. Later Steve takes Mike up, but the engine flames out and Mike passes out. Steve seizes the controls and lands the aircraft safely, saving them both and the aircraft. Finally, his students accept Steve, realizing he is just trying to help them achieve their goal of becoming test pilots.

Cast

 Rex Reason as Capt. Steve Morley
 Dick Foran as Lt. Col. Henry Spalding
 Audrey Dalton as Susan Blair
 Barry Coe as Capt. "Cotton" Davis
 Buck Class as Maj. Mike Geron
 Robert Dix as Lt. Jimmy Erskine
 Lee Farr as Capt. Murphy
 Giuseppe Addobbati as Kurt Weber 
 Robert Conrad as Lt. Robert "Tiger Bob" Kiley
 Maudie Prickett as Mrs. Blocher
 Richard Monahan as Mechanic #1 
 Sid Melton as Sgt. Eddie Stone
 William Kerwin as Gary
 Gregg Palmer as Capt. Cory Dexter
 Lionel Ames as Capt. "Andy" Anderson
 Bill Bradley as Student #1

ProductionThundering Jets was filmed primarily at the United States Flight Test School at Edwards Air Force Base, employing the school's Lockheed T-33 Shooting Star jet training aircraft. The production used mainly stock footage with one T-33 on loan to the studio and was featured in the process shots.

Reception
Aviation film historian Stephen Pendo in Aviation in the Cinema, considered Thundering Jets a "... poor picture and has only routine aerial shots."

References
Notes

Citations

Bibliography

 Orriss, Bruce. When Hollywood Ruled the Skies: The Post World War II Years. Hawthorne, California: Aero Associates Inc., 2018. .
 Pendo, Stephen. Aviation in the Cinema''. Lanham, Maryland: Scarecrow Press, 1985. .

External links 
 
Thundering Jets at TCMDB

1958 films
American aviation films
20th Century Fox films
American drama films
1958 drama films
Films about the United States Air Force
1950s English-language films
1950s American films